In film and video, a freeze frame is when a single frame of content shows repeatedly on the screen—"freezing" the action. This can be done in the content itself, by printing (on film) or recording (on video) multiple copies of the same source frame. This produces a static shot that resembles a still photograph.

Freeze frame is a term in live stage performance, for a technique in which actors freeze at a particular point to enhance a scene or show an important moment in production. Spoken word may enhance the effect, with a narrator or one or more characters telling their personal thoughts regarding the situation.

Examples

Film
The first known freeze frame was in director Alfred Hitchcock's 1928 film Champagne.
An early use of the freeze frame in classic Hollywood cinema was Frank Capra's 1946 Christmas film It's A Wonderful Life where the first appearance of the adult George Bailey (played by James Stewart) on-screen is shown as a freeze frame. 
A memorable freeze frame is the end of François Truffaut's 1959 New Wave film The 400 Blows.
Satyajit Ray is known for his use of freeze frame shots. Notable examples include the last scene of Charulata (1964) and the first scene  of Jana Aranya (1975). The last scene of Charulata is critically acclaimed. Charu and her husband are about to unite and hold their hands when the screen freezes and a small gap is left in between their hands. Another film known for frequent use of this technique is Parash Pathar (1957). The same technique is also used by Ray in Mahapurush to introduce Ganesh Mama, one of the characters in the movie.
Director George Roy Hill used the technique frequently when depicting the death of a character, as in The World According to Garp (1982) and in the memorable ending to the classic western Butch Cassidy and the Sundance Kid (1969), with Paul Newman and Robert Redford. The freeze frame ending of The Color of Money (1986) also featured Paul Newman.
Hong Kong director John Woo also makes extensive use of freeze frames shots, usually to gain a better focus on a character's facial expression or emotion at a critical scene.
This technique is used quite a lot in Peter Hedges' 2003 film Pieces of April to capture moments he feels particularly significant.
It has also been used in the Oceans film series directed by Steven Soderbergh at the end of the film.

Television
 The original 1965 series Lost in Space used a "Freeze-frame cliffhanger" in its first two seasons (59 episodes).
The 1970s television series of Wonder Woman had its episodes end with a freeze-frame of Diana Prince smiling.
The opening sequence of the Mary Tyler Moore Show ended with a freeze-frame of Moore tossing her hat in the air.
The American TV show NCIS—a spin-off of the series JAG—often uses freeze-frame shots. In the production, they were referred to as "phoofs" or "foofs" due to the sound effect that accompanied them, which was created by NCIS'''s creator and executive producer Donald P. Bellisario hitting a microphone with his hand. These short black and white freeze frames depict an event that will occur later in the episode, and usually last for three seconds. The technique first appeared in the fourth episode of the second season of NCIS, Lt. Jane Doe, and was employed in every episode since, with a typical episode containing four or five freeze frames with main characters or occasionally one-off or recurring characters.
Freeze frames were parodied in the 1982 sitcom Police Squad!. Each episode ended — and the credits rolled over — a "freeze frame" shot emulating those of 1970s dramas. However, the scene was not actually frozen. The actors simply stood motionless in position while other activities (pouring coffee, a convict escaping, a chimpanzee throwing paper) continued around them.
The freeze-frame cliffhanger to Part Three of the Doctor Who serial The Deadly Assassin'' (1976) has been described as "notorious in BBC history" and "caused such uproar when it originally aired that it had to be altered for future broadcasts".

References

Cinematic techniques